Stanley House at 550 King's Road is a 17th-century house in Chelsea, London, the former house of Admiral Sir Charles Wager. It is a Grade II* listed building.

History
The house was built for the Stanley family in 1691. In the early 18th century, it was occupied by Thomas Arundell, son of Henry Arundell, 5th Baron Arundell of Wardour, before becoming the home of Admiral Sir Charles Wager who died there in 1743. It was acquired by the Countess of Strathmore in 1777 before coming into the ownership of Sir William Hamilton, British Envoy at the Court of Naples who erected some casts of the Elgin Marbles in the house, in the early 19th century. It became the residence of the Principal of the College of St Mark and St John, a training school for teachers, in the mid 19th century. The house was acquired for £10 million by Boris Berezovsky in 2005.

References

Chelsea, London
Grade II* listed houses in London
Houses completed in 1691
Houses in the Royal Borough of Kensington and Chelsea
King's Road, Chelsea, London